Homalium rufescens is a species of plant in the family Salicaceae. It is endemic to South Africa.

References

Flora of South Africa
rufescens
Least concern plants
Taxonomy articles created by Polbot